Kidlington Football Club is a football club based in Kidlington, Oxfordshire, England.

History
The club was established in 1909. They initially played in village leagues and won the Lord Jersey Cup in 1929, beating Fritwell 2–1 in the final. In 1945 the club joined the Oxford City Junior League, before progressing to the Oxfordshire Senior League in 1951. They were champions of the league in 1952–53 and moved up to the Hellenic League in 1954. When the league gained a second division in 1956, the club were placed in the Premier Division.

In 1961–62 Kidlington finishing second-from-bottom of the Premier Division and were relegated to Division One. They were Division One runners-up in 1963–64, earning promotion back to the Premier Division. However, they were relegated again two seasons later. League reorganisation saw them placed in Division One B in 1971–72, before it reverted to a single division the following season. The club won the Division One Cup in 1974–75, and after finishing as Division One runners-up in 1978–79, they were promoted back to the Premier Division. However, the club finished bottom of the Premier Division in 1981–82, resulting in relegation to Division One.

In 2000 Division One was split into regional sections, with Kidlington placed in Division One West. A third-place finish in 2004–05 saw them promoted to the Premier Division. They won the league's Floodlit Cup in 2007–08 and the Supplmentary Cup in 2010–11. After finishing the 2015–16 season as Premier Division champions, the club were promoted to Division One East of the Southern League. At the end of the following season they were transferred to Division One West. The club were transferred to the newly formed Division One Central for the 2018–19 season.

Honours
Hellenic League
Premier Division champions 2015–16
Supplementary Cup winners 2010–11
Floodlit Cup winners 2007–08
Division One Cup winners 1974–75
Oxfordshire Senior League
Champions 1952–53
Oxfordshire Intermediate Cup
Winners 1952–53, 1969–70, 1984–85
Lord Jersey Cup
Winners 1928–29

Records
Best FA Cup performance: Second qualifying round 2015–16, 2017–18, 2019–20, 2020–21
Best FA Trophy performance: Third qualifying round, 2020–21
Best FA Vase performance: Quarter-finals, 2015–16
Record attendance: 2,000 vs Showbiz XI, friendly match, 1973

See also
Kidlington F.C. players

References

External links
Official website

Football clubs in England
Football clubs in Oxfordshire
Association football clubs established in 1909
1909 establishments in England
Oxfordshire Senior Football League
Hellenic Football League
Southern Football League clubs
Kidlington